Roberto Maytín and Jackson Withrow were the defending champions but chose to defend their title with different partners. Maytín partnered Robert Galloway but lost in the first round to Filip Peliwo and Roy Smith. Withrow partnered Martin Redlicki and successfully defended his title.

Redlicki and Withrow won the title after defeating Nathan Pasha and Max Schnur 6–4, 7–6(7–4) in the final.

Seeds

Draw

References

External links
 Main draw

Columbus Challenger III - Doubles
Columbus Challenger